Wild palm is a common name for several plants and may refer to:

 Wild plants of the palm family, Arecaceae
Quararibea pterocalyx, in the family Malvaceae